Louis, Count of Montpensier may refer to:

 Louis I, Count of Montpensier (1405–1486)
 Louis II, Count of Montpensier (1483–1501)